Charlie Finch (born February 21, 2003), known by his stage name Charlieonnafriday (stylized in all lowercase), is an American rapper and singer. He gained attention with his debut album OnnaFriday, released by Island Records.

Early life and education 

Finch was born in Seattle, Washington on February 21, 2003. He started making music in 8th grade and focused on it more during high school during COVID-19.

Career 

Finch gained attention with his eight-track debut album OnnaFriday, released in April 2022 by Island Records, particularly with the song "After Hours," which has over 37 million streams on Spotify. He has been credited with helping to shape Seattle's modern hip-hop sound.

Charlie launched his own brand of merchandise, "onnafriday", on October 28, 2022.

Discography

Charting singles

References

2003 births

Living people
Rappers from Seattle